Aramis is an American luxury fragrance brand, introduced by Estée Lauder in 1964. It was the first prestige men’s fragrance widely available in department stores, and is now sold in 120 countries. Aramis was created by perfumer Bernard Chant.

It is classified as a leather chypre; its top notes are fresh/bitter herb    combined with a   body odor note from cumin, followed by gardenia, jasmine, amber and sandalwood.

Perfumer and fragrance historian Roja Dove has called it "an incredibly refined and distinctive fragrance” that is "as much of a legend as the hero it was named after."

External links
 Aramis at Basenotes
 Aramis at Fragrantica
 Roja Elysium

References

Perfumes
History of cosmetics
Products introduced in 1964